The history of the Bulgarian speedway began in 1961, when Bulgaria took part in the World Team Cup Continental Semifinal on July 30 in the Polish city of Rybnik. The Bulgarian team consisted of Milko Peykov / 4 points, Boris Damianov / 3 points, Dimitar Baev / 3 points, Plamen Alexandrov / 4 points, and Gabriel Matsev / reserve.

Speedway

Team Championship

Individual Championship

Individual U-21 Championship

Pairs Championship

See also 
 Bulgaria national speedway team

References